The men's doubles tournament at the 1980 US Open was held from August 26 to September 7, 1980, on the outdoor hard courts at the USTA National Tennis Center in New York City, United States. Bob Lutz and Stan Smith won the title, defeating John McEnroe and Peter Fleming in the final.

Seeds

Draw

Finals

Top half

Section 1

Section 2

Bottom half

Section 3

Section 4

External links
 Main draw
1980 US Open – Men's draws and results at the International Tennis Federation

Men's doubles
US Open (tennis) by year – Men's doubles